Jurisdictional dualism in France is the separation of the French court system into two separate branches: the  ordinary courts, and the . The ordinary courts, also known as the judiciary order, handle criminal and civil cases, while the administrative courts handle disputes between individuals and the government. This dual system allows for a clear separation of powers and specialized handling of cases related to the actions of the government.The administrative courts are headed by the Council of State, and the ordinary courts by the Court of Cassation for judiciary law. 

The separation of public law (administrative) and private law (judiciary) goes back to Roman law. A separate branch for public law existed during the Ancien régime. Many other countries have such a system (including in common-law countries) not only in having a separate judicial order for administrative courts (which exist also in Germany, for example, with Article 95 of the Basic Law of Germany). However, France is exceptional in this regard because of the position of the administrative judge in being superior to the administration, and because administrative law is largely unwritten, and established mostly by administrative judicial jurisprudence. That is, administrative law derives largely from case law written by administrative judges, and not by laws passed by the legislature. 

In the case of the judiciary order, codes are established by the legislature and open to all. but as administrative law is result of jursprudence and uncodified, it is not discussed in Parliament, not published in the Journal Officiel, and hidden from the public.

When there is a potential conflict of jurisdiction between courts of the administrative order and courts of the judiciary order, this is handled by the Tribunal des conflits.

Judiciary order 

Courts of the judiciary order have jurisdiction for settling disputes between private individuals and to punish the perpetrators of criminal offenses.  The judicial order is subdivided into two categories of courts: the civil courts and the criminal courts. Civil courts settle disputes (for example, rent, divorce, inheritance) but do not impose penalties. Criminal courts punish offences against people, property and society.

Administrative order 

Courts of the administrative order have jurisdiction when a "public person" (not a human, but a ) is involved, for example, a municipality or a government department. Courts of the administrative order are organized in three levels: The Council of State, the administrative courts of appeal in the second instance, and the administrative tribunals in the first instance; these courts ensure a balance between the prerogatives of public power and the rights of citizens.

See also 

 Adversarial system
 Code pénal (France)
 Codification (law)
 Cour d'appel (Appellate court)
 Court of Appeal (France)  
 Court of Cassation
 Criminal justice system of France
 French criminal law
 Glossary of French criminal law
 Inquisitorial system
 Law of France
 Napoleonic Code

References 

Notes

Citations

Works cited

Further reading 

 

 

 

 

 

 

  Lay version

External links 
 Légifrance, official French government legal website

French criminal law
Government of France
Legal history of France